This is a list of Canadian women writers in French who were born in Canada or  whose writings in French are closely associated with that country.

It was in the mid-19th century that French-speaking women began to contribute to Canadian literature, partly as a result of growing Quebec patriotism but also because of the influence of the Catholic church and developments in education. Early contributors include the novelists Laure Conan and Gabrielle Roy and the poet Blanche Lamontagne-Beauregard. Women's greatest contribution has however been since the 1960s and above all since the 1980s, triggered by increased interest in feminism. Some sources have pointed to significant differences between English-Canadian and French-Canadian literature, resulting in part from the protected language identity of the Province of Quebec where French-language radio and television and pop-stars reinforce its insularity.

A
Marie-Célie Agnant (born 1953), poet, novelist and children's writer
Francine Allard (born 1949), educator, novelist, poet and visual artist
Geneviève Amyot (1945–2000), poet and novelist
Linda Amyot (born 1958), novelist, short story writer, children's writer
Marguerite Andersen (1924–2022), German-born French-language poet and editor
Maryse Andraos (born 1988), novelist
Ginette Anfousse (born 1944), writer and illustrator of children's books
Nelly Arcan (1973–2009), novelist
Suzanne Aubry (born 1956), novelist, scriptwriter, playwright
Aude, pen name of Claudette Charbonneau-Tissot (1947–2012), novelist, short story writer, children's writer

B
Robertine Barry (1863–1910), journalist and publisher
Angèle Bassolé-Ouédraogo (born 1967), Ivorian-born poet and journalist
Estelle Beauchamp (fl. from 1995), novelist
Jacqueline Beaugé-Rosier (1932–2016), Haitian-born Canadian educator and writer
Germaine Beaulieu (born 1949), poet and novelist
Nicole Bélanger (born 1962), novelist and screenwriter
Jovette Bernier (1900–1981), journalist and poet
Louky Bersianik, pen name of Lucille Durand, (1930–2011), novelist
Claudine Bertrand (born 1948), educator and poet
Lise Bissonnette (born 1945), writer and journalist
Marie-Claire Blais (1939–2021), novelist, poet and playwright
Virginie Blanchette-Doucet (born 1989), novelist
Lise Blouin (born 1944), educator and novelist
France Boisvert (born 1959), educator and writer
Monique Bosco (1927–2007), Austrian-born Canadian journalist and writer
Mylène Bouchard (born 1978), novelist and non-fiction writer
Lise Bourbeau (born 1941), writer of self help books
Lysette Brochu (born 1946), novelist and short story writer
Hélène Brodeur (1923–2010), educator, journalist and writer
Nicole Brossard (born 1943), poet and novelist
Chrystine Brouillet (born 1958), novelist
Françoise Bujold (1933–1981), poet, radio playwright, artist and publisher

C
Chantal Cadieux (born 1967), playwright, novelist and screenwriter
Catherine Chandler (born 1950), poet and translator
Lisa Carducci (born 1943), poet, short story writer and novelist
Claudine Chatel (born 1951), actress and writer
Évelyne de la Chenelière (born 1975), playwright and actress
Adrienne Choquette (1915–1973), journalist, editor, novelist, short story writer
Andrée Christensen (born 1952), educator, editor, poet and novelist
Stéfanie Clermont (born 1988), poet, novelist
Anne Élaine Cliche (born 1959), novelist, essayist
Yolande Cohen (born 1950), historian
Daria Colonna (born 1989), poet
Laure Conan, pen name of Marie-Louise-Félicité Angers, (1845–1924), first French-Canadian novelist
Héloïse Côté (born 1979), fantasy novelist, academic
Reine-Aimée Côté (born 1948), teacher, novelist
Maya Cousineau Mollen (born 1975), poet
Arlette Cousture (born 1948), historical fiction writer
Gracia Couturier (born 1951), educator, children's writer, novelist and playwright

D
Francine D'Amour (born 1946), educator, novelist
France Daigle (born 1953), novelist and playwright
Anne Dandurand (born 1953), novelist and actress
Diane-Monique Daviau (born 1951), educator, writer, translator and journalist
Carole David (born 1955), poet and novelist
Claire Dé, pen name of Claire Dandurand, (born 1953), short story writer, playwright and novelist 
Corinne De Vailly (born 1959), French-born Canadian novelist, children's writer
Monique Deland (born 1958), educator, journalist and poet
Jeanne-Mance Delisle (born 1939 or 1941), playwright
Denise Desautels (born 1945), poet and playwright
Martine Desjardins (born 1957), novelist
Roxane Desjardins (born 1991), writer, editor 
Sylvie Desrosiers (born 1954), novelist, screenwriter
Aurore Dessureault-Descôteaux (1926–2015), playwright
Hélène Dorion (born 1958), poet, novelist, essayist
Christiane Duchesne (born 1949), researcher, educator, illustrator, translator and novelist
Louise Dupré (born 1949), journalist, educator, poet, playwright and novelist

E
Gloria Escomel (born 1941), Uruguayan-born Canadian educator, novelist and playwright

F
Abla Farhoud (1945–2021), Lebanese-born Canadian playwright and novelist
Jocelyne Felx (born 1949), literary critic and writer
Madeleine Ferron (1922–2010), novelist
Naomi Fontaine (born 1987), novelist
Dominique Fortier (born 1972), novelist and translator
Arlette Fortin (1949–2009), novelist
Danielle Fournier (born 1955), educator, poet, novelist and essayist
Christiane Frenette (born 1954), educator, poet and novelist

G
Madeleine Gagnon (born 1938), educator, literary critic and novelist
Karoline Georges (born 1970), novelist, short story writer, poet and children's writer
Mylène Gilbert-Dumas (born 1967), novelist
Gabrielle Gourdeau (1952–2006), literary critic, novelist
Germaine Guèvremont (1893–1968), journalist, novelist

H
Hélène Harbec (born 1946), poet, novelist
Pauline Harvey (born 1950), novelist
Anne Hébert (1916–2000), poet, novelist, short story writer and playwright
Nicole Houde (1945–2016), novelist and short story writer
Céline Huyghebaert, novelist

J
Suzanne Jacob (born 1943), novelist, poet, playwright, singer-songwriter and critic

K
Hélène Koscielniak (fl. from 2007), novelist

L
Andrée Laberge (born 1953), novelist
Marie Laberge (born 1950), actress, educator, poet and playwright
Marie-Sissi Labrèche (born 1969), screenwriter, novelist
Chloé LaDuchesse, poet
Claire de Lamirande (1929–2009), novelist, literary critic
Michèle Laframboise (born 1960), science fiction writer and comics artist
Claire de Lamirande (1929–2009), novelist and literary critic
Blanche Lamontagne-Beauregard (1889–1958), early Quebec poet
Tania Langlais (born 1979), poet and educator
Claudia Larochelle (born 1978), journalist, radio host, columnist and novelist
Monique LaRue (born 1948), novelist, short story writer and essayist
Mona Latif-Ghattas (1946–2021), Egyptian-born Canadian novelist, poet and short story writer
Marie-Renée Lavoie (born 1974), novelist
Louise Leblanc (born 1942), educator, novelist, screenwriter
Perrine Leblanc (born 1980), novelist
Rachel Leclerc (born 1955), poet and novelist
Françoise Lepage (1945–2010), educator, non-fiction writer and children's writer
Anne Legault (born 1958), actress, playwright and educator
Catherine Leroux (born 1979), novelist, short story writer
Marguerite Lescop (1915–2020), novelist

M
Louise Maheux-Forcier (1929–2015), novelist
Michèle Mailhot (1932–2009), novelist
Andrée Maillet (1921–1995), short story writer, poet and novelist
Antonine Maillet (born 1929), novelist and playwright
Jovette Marchessault (1938–2012), novelist, poet, playwright, painter and sculptor
Michèle Marineau (born 1955), novelist and translator
Suzanne Martel (1924–2012), journalist, novelist and children's writer
Claire Martin (1914–2014), short story writer, novelist, autobiographer
Carole Massé (born 1949), poet, novelist
Marie-Sœurette Mathieu (born 1949), Haitian-born Canadian teacher, poet and novelist
Catherine Mavrikakis (born 1961), novelist
Julie Mazzieri (born 1975), novelist and translator
Andrée A. Michaud (born 1957), novelist and playwright
Pauline Michel (born 1944), novelist, poet, playwright, songwriter and screenwriter
Hélène Monette (1960–2015), poet
Madeleine Monette (born 1951), poet, novelist, short story writer and essayist

N
Yvette Naubert (1918–1982), playwright and novelist
Francine Noël (born 1945), playwright and novelist

O
Madeleine Ouellette-Michalska (born 1930), novelist, essayist and diarist
Francine Ouellette (born 1947), novelist
Hélène Ouvrard (1938–1999), playwright, novelist, poet and short story writer

P
Suzanne Paradis (born 1932), poet and novelist
Alice Parizeau (1930–1990), Polish-born Canadian novelist
Aline Poulin (1965–2011), poet and novelist
Francine Pelletier (born 1959), science fiction novelist and short story writer
Hélène Pelletier-Baillargeon (born 1932), journalist, essayist, and biographer
Maryse Pelletier (born 1946), actress, playwright and novelist
Stéphanie Pelletier (born 1980), short story writer, novelist
Geneviève Pettersen (born 1982), novelist
Michèle Plomer (born 1965), novelist, children's writer, translator
Anique Poitras (1961–2016), novelist
Marie-Hélène Poitras (born 1975), novelist and journalist
Gabrielle Poulin (1929–2015), novelist, short story writer and poet
Monique Proulx (born 1952), novelist, short story writer and screenwriter

Q
Judy Quinn (born 1974), poet and novelist
Pascale Quiviger (born 1969), poet, novelist and essayist

R
Bernadette Renaud (born 1945), novelist and young people's writer
Thérèse Renaud (1927–2005), actress, poet and novelist
Aurélie Resch (born 1971), travel writer, poet, novelist and short story writer
Hélène Rioux (born 1949), novelist and translator
Dominique Robert (born 1957), poet, novelist and short story writer
Suzanne Robert (1948–2007), novelist, short story writer
Régine Robin (1939–2021), novelist and non-fiction writer
Esther Rochon (born 1948), novelist, science fiction writer
Maryse Rouy (born 1951), French-born novelist
Gabrielle Roy (1909–1983), influential novelist, educator, autobiographer

S
Anne-Marie Saint-Cerny (born 1954), novelist, non-fiction writer and politician
Annette Saint-Pierre (born 1925), educator, novelist and publisher
Marie Savard (1936–2012), poet and radio scriptwriter
Jocelyne Saucier (born 1948), novelist and journalist
Dominique Scali (born 1984), journalist and novelist
Aki Shimazaki (born 1954), Japanese-born translator and novelist
Louise Simard (born 1950), novelist

T
Olivia Tapiero (born 1990), novelist
France Théoret (born 1942), feminist, poet, novelist, playwright and essayist
Marie José Thériault (born 1945), poet, novelist, performer and translator
Kim Thúy (born 1968), Vietnamese-born Canadian novelist
Lola Lemire Tostevin (born 1937), poet, novelist and feminist writer
Lise Tremblay (born 1957), novelist and educator
Clarisse Tremblay (1951–1999), poet
Danielle Trussart (born 1948), visual artist, novelist and children's writer
Élise Turcotte (born 1957), novelist and educator
Roxane Turcotte (born 1952), children's and youth literature writer

V
Hélène Vachon (born 1947), children's writer, novelist
Lise Vaillancourt (born 1954), playwright, novelist
Christine Dumitriu Van Saanen (1932–2008), Romanian-born French language poet and essayist
Mélissa Verreault (born 1983), novelist, short story writer and translator
Yolande Villemaire (born 1949), short story writer, novelist and poet
Élisabeth Vonarburg (born 1947), French-born Canadian science fiction writer and novelist

W
Audrée Wilhelmy (born 1985), novelist

Y
Ying Chen (born 1961), Chinese-born Canadian novelist

See also

Canadian literature
Quebec literature

References

-
-
Canadian women writers in French, List of
Writers in French, List of Canadian
Women writers in French, List of Canadian